A total lunar eclipse took place on November 9, 2003, the second of two total lunar eclipses in 2003, the first being on May 16, 2003. It is the first total lunar eclipse of 21st century which happened on a micromoon day.

This was the last of 14 total lunar eclipses of Lunar Saros 126, which started on 19 June 1769 and ended on 9 November 2003.

Visibility

Photo gallery

Relation to other lunar eclipses

Eclipse season 

This is the first eclipse this season.

Second eclipse this season: 23 November 2003 Total Solar Eclipse

Eclipses of 2003 

 A total lunar eclipse on May 16.
 An annular solar eclipse (one limit) on May 31.
 A total lunar eclipse on November 9.
 A total solar eclipse on November 23.

Lunar year series
It is the second of four lunar year cycles, repeating every 354 days.

Saros series

Metonic series

This eclipse is the second of five Metonic cycle lunar eclipses on the same date, November 8–9, each separated by 19 years:

Half-Saros cycle
A lunar eclipse will be preceded and followed by solar eclipses by 9 years and 5.5 days (a half saros). This lunar eclipse is related to two total solar eclipses of Solar Saros 133.

See also
 List of lunar eclipses and List of 21st-century lunar eclipses
 Solar eclipse of November 23, 2003
 May 2003 lunar eclipse
 May 2004 lunar eclipse
 October 2004 lunar eclipse

References

External links

 Saros cycle 126
 
 NASA Saros series 126
 Photos: Lunar Eclipse 8 November 2003
 Spaceweather.com: Lunar eclipse gallery Nov 8, 2003

2003-11
2003 in science
November 2003 events